Good Night, My Love is a 1961 Argentine film.

Cast
Miguel Amador
Floren Delbene
Gilda Lousek
Elena Lucena

External links
 

1961 films
1960s Spanish-language films
Argentine black-and-white films
Films directed by Román Viñoly Barreto
1960s Argentine films